The second season of Calle 7 began on Monday, August 3, 2009. The new competitors were presented, and called "Challenging Team", they will team up to compete against the well known "Team Calle 7" that includes the first season winner Francisco "Chapu" Puelles. The competition system is the same as the one utilized in the first season; On Mondays and Wednesdays, the two teams compete in three events, each worth 100, 200 and 300 points. The winner of those days is saved from competing in elimination, while the loser has to compete among themselves on Tuesdays and Thursdays to elect a nominated team member. The elimination competition is on Fridays, and the loser leaves Calle 7 for ever. This season is formally presented Jean Philippe Cretton as the co-host of Calle 7.

The Final was on January 29, 2010 on a prime time schedule (22:00 hours GMT-4) the contestant that became the winner of the 2nd season of Calle 7, for second time,  Francisco "Chapu" Puelles taking the big final prize 5 million chilean pesos (US$9,500) a prize that he share 50% with Felipe Camus, so he can continue his dream of studding.
Felipe Camus take the second place and obtain 500,000 chilean pesos (US$930), and also a symbolic award "Spirit of Calle 7" for being the one the better shows the values of the program, as clean competition and friendship.

Teams

Original teams

New teams
The new teams of the second season of Calle 7 were presented on August 26, 2009, due to the constant defeats suffered by the Red challenging team.  It was decided that the teams were not equally balanced, so new teams were created and the following is the new structure:

Teams competition

nominated due to injury in the previous week
Belén Muñoz leaving the competition
replacing Solange Grassi
replacing Constanza Vivas
Ronny was injured the week prior
replacing Valentina Roth
Francisco "Chapu" Puelles replaces Valeria Ortega as the nominated one
Paz Duarte presented an injury
winner of the repechaje
Yuri Gutierrez missed
replacing Yuri Gutierrez
replacing Alain Soulat

Individual competition

none because the Christmas parades
none because the team is celebrating Christmas
none because New Year
both winners
substituted by Alain Soulat
substituted bt Constanza Vivas
both winners

send directly to the big final by the public

Elimination order

References
La Movida No Pudo con su Debut
Martin Carcamo Interview

External links
Web official Site
Become a Calle 7 Fan

2009 Chilean television seasons
2010 Chilean television seasons